The Shuttle may refer to:

The Shuttle (bus), a free bus in Christchurch, New Zealand
The Shuttle (film), a 1918 American silent film
The Shuttle (newspaper), a free weekly in Worcestershire, England
The Shuttle (novel), a 1907 novel by Frances Hodgson Burnett

See also
 Shuttle (disambiguation)